Dragan Kamberov (born February 2, 1995) is a Macedonian professional basketball player who currently plays for Blokotehna.

References

1995 births
Living people
Macedonian men's basketball players
Small forwards
People from Gevgelija